Killoe Young Emmets (Irish: Emmet Óg Cill Eo) is a Gaelic Football and Ladies' Gaelic football club based in Killoe, County Longford, Ireland. The club is also referred to by the Irish 'Emmet Óg' or by 'Killoe Emmet Óg'. Organised Gaelic Games in the Parish of Killoe can trace its origins back to 1889 with the foundation of the first club in the parish (Killoe Erins Pride). The Killoe Young Emmets club first emerged in 1903 and was first recorded in Senior Championship competition in 1904 and has won 13 Longford Senior Football Championship titles and 1 Longford Senior Hurling Championship title. The club also has thriving Underage (Killoe Óg) and Ladies (Killoe) clubs.

History

 The first GAA club in the Killoe area was founded in 1889 as Killoe Erin's Hope (soon renamed Killoe Erin's Pride). The earliest published record of a Killoe game was a tournament fixture between Killoe Erins Pride & Dromard O’Briens in Cornadrung in November 1889. The tournament in Colmcille included Drumlish Emmets, Mullinalaghta Leaguers, Arva Davitts, Cornafean Tom Moroneys, Killoe Erin’s Pride, Dromard O’Briens, Mullahoran Milesians, Ballywillan Michael Davitts and Gowna West Breffnies. 

Killoe Young Emmets first emerges in 1903. By 1905 all other Killoe clubs and teams that had come and gone in the parish (Killoe Erin's Pride, Killoe McMahons, Soran O'Connells Sons, Killoe Young Erins Pride and Rhyne Hardy Rovers) had given way to one single club named Killoe Young Emmets (named after the Irish patriot Robert Emmet). The earliest reference to Killoe Young Emmets is found in late 1903. The clubs crest shows 1889 because that is the origin year for GAA in Killoe. The Club is based at Emmet Park with facilities including clubhouse, floodlit pitches, gym & meeting rooms which was officially opened by GAA President Peter Quinn in the company of then Taoiseach Albert Reynolds in June 1993.

Killoe participates across all Gaelic Football competition age groups in Longford and also participates in Scór competition, winning 4 Leinster titles and reaching 5 All Ireland Finals across Scór and Scór na Óg. 

 Killoe GAA comprises Senior Club, Minor Club & Ladies Club, competing in Gaelic Football from Under 12 to Senior grades. 

 Killoe's first titles are the Longford Senior Football Championship & Longford Senior Hurling Championship double in 1907.

 Killoe had notable success during the 1910s, winning Longford Senior Football titles in 1911, 1913 & 1915. 

 Killoe played Junior in 1920s, 1930s, 1940s and much of 1950s, returning to Senior in the late 1950's and contesting the SFC final in 1959 before winning the Longford Senior Football Championship in 1960.

 Killoe club was relegated to Intermediate in mid-1960s and won promoted back to Senior grade in 1977.

 Since promotion in 1977, the club won 8 Senior Football Championship titles (1988, 1993, 1995, 2012, 2014, 2015, 2019 & 2020). 

 Killoe played in the Leinster Senior Club Football Championship in 1988, 1993, 1995, 2012, 2014, 2015    & 2019, reaching the Semi-Final twice.

 Two Killoe players have been nominated for All Stars... John 'Speedy' McCormack (1984, 1985, 1986) & Michael Quinn (2012). 

 Killoe's Seán McCormack was joint top scorer (4-32) in the 2013 National Football League, along with Dublin's Bernard Brogan.

Notable players
 Michael Quinn - All Star nominee
 Sean McCormack - inter-county footballer

Killoe Young Emmets
(Honours to end of 2022)

* 1956 Junior League title was won as Killoe Slashers (Amalgamation with Whiterock Slashers)

Killoe Óg
(Honours to end of 2022)

* Denotes underage titles won as part of an amalgamation with other club(s)

** Denotes U13 competition prior to U14 grades changing to U13 from 2021

Amalgamations Clarified:

 Minor Championship 1978: Killoe Region (Killoe + Clonbroney + St. Mels)
 Minor Championship 1985: Killoe Region (Killoe + St. Mels)
 Minor Championship 1990: Killoe + Clonbroney
 Minor League Div 2 1999: Camlin Rovers (Killoe + Ballymore)
 Minor League Div 2 2000: Camlin Rovers (Killoe + Clonbroney)
 Juvenile Championship 1980: Killoe Region (Killoe + Clonbroney + St. Colmcilles)
 Juvenile Championship 1983: Killoe Region (Killoe + Clonbroney + St. Colmcilles)

Killoe Ladies
(Honours to end of 2022)

** Includes Senior B titles pre 2008 which are same as Junior Championship

Other honours
 GAA MacNamee Award - Best Website 2012
 Leinster GAA - Best Website 2014
 GAA Healthy Club 2018

References

External links

 Killoe GAA Website
 Longford Gaelic Stats Website

Gaelic games clubs in County Longford
Gaelic football clubs in County Longford